Hayley M Brown (born 25 March 1998) is an English cricketer who currently plays for Northamptonshire. She plays as a right-handed batter. She previously played for Huntingdonshire, Essex and Sunrisers.

Domestic career
Brown made her county debut in 2014, for Huntingdonshire against Cambridgeshire, top-scoring for her side with 16*.  The following season, she joined Northamptonshire. Brown was part of the side that won promotion in both the County Championship and Twenty20 Cup in 2017, and was her side's leading run-scorer in the Championship, with 125 runs including her maiden county half-century. In 2019, Brown was again her side's leading run-scorer in the County Championship, this time scoring 232 runs including her maiden county century, scoring 111* against Cambridgeshire and Huntingdonshire. Northamptonshire also topped their division in both competitions that season.

In 2020, Brown played for Sunrisers in the Rachael Heyhoe Flint Trophy. She played one match, scoring 16 against South East Stars. 

In 2021, Brown joined Essex, and played four matches for the side in the Twenty20 Cup, scoring 42 runs. She was also included in Sunrisers' Academy squad for the season. In 2022, she returned to Northamptonshire, playing six matches for the side in the East of England Women's County Championship, where she was the fifth-highest run-scorer in the tournament, with 172 runs at an average of 34.40.

References

External links

1998 births
Living people
Place of birth missing (living people)
Huntingdonshire women cricketers
Northamptonshire women cricketers
Essex women cricketers
Sunrisers women's cricketers